Geoff Richardson may refer to:

Geoffrey Richardson (musician) (born 1950), English musician
Geoff Richardson (cricketer) (born 1956), Australian cricketer
Geoff Richardson (rugby) (born 1949), Australian rugby footballer
Geoff Richardson (racing driver) (1924–2007), English racing driver

See also
Jeff Richardson (disambiguation)